George Leavitt may refer to:

 George Baker Leavitt Sr. (1860–1925), mariner who captained several whaling vessels out of New Bedford, Massachusetts
 George Ayres Leavitt (1822–1888), founded several of New York's earliest publishing firms